Victory is a 1928 British silent war film directed by M.A. Wetherell and starring Moore Marriott, Walter Byron and Julie Suedo. It began filming in October 1927 and was released in March the following year. It was made at Isleworth Studios.

Main cast
 Moore Marriott as Seth Lee
 Walter Byron as Major King
 Julie Suedo as Marie Dulac
 Marie Ault as Mother
 Griffith Humphreys as General Van Doorn
 Douglas Herald as Captain Wein
 Marjorie Gaffney as Julie
 Victor Maxim Moorkins as Pierre

References

Bibliography
 Low, Rachael. History of the British Film, 1918-1929. George Allen & Unwin, 1971.
 Wood, Linda. British Films 1927-1939. British Film Institute, 1986.

External links

1928 films
1928 war films
British war films
1920s English-language films
Films directed by M. A. Wetherell
British silent feature films
Films shot at Isleworth Studios
Films set in the 1910s
British World War I films
British black-and-white films
1920s British films